Energy in Portugal describes energy and electricity production, consumption and import in Portugal. Energy policy of Portugal will describe the politics of Portugal related to energy more in detail. Electricity sector in Portugal is the main article of electricity in Portugal.

Overview

Coal 
Sines power plant (hard coal) started operation in 1985–1989 in Portugal. According to WWF its  emissions were among the top dirty ones in Portugal in 2007. That coal power plant went offline in January 2021, leaving only one remaining coal power plant in the country, which closed at 7h15 on the 19th of November 2021.

Natural gas 
Maghreb–Europe Gas Pipeline (MEG) is a natural gas pipeline, from Algeria through Morocco to Andalusia, Spain.

Renewable energy

Solar 
Portugal has supported and increased the solar electricity (Photovoltaic power) and solar thermal energy (solar heating) during 2006–2010.  Portugal was 9th in solar heating in the EU and 8th in solar power based on total volume in 2010.

Water 

Portugal has also been using water power to generate power for the country. In the 2010s, a local company, Wave Roller installed many devices along the coast to make use of the water power.

Nuclear power

Electricity in Portugal

Transport 
The sustainable strategy has been a shift from individual to collective transport within the Lisbon Metropolitan Area (Metro Lisbon (ML), collective buses, Companhia Carris de ferro de Lisboa).

Global warming

According to Energy Information Administration the CO2 emissions from energy consumption of Portugal were in 2009 56.5 Mt, slightly over Bangladesh with 160 million people and Finland with 5.3 million people. The emissions per capita were (tonnes): Portugal 5.58, India 1.38, China 5.83, Europe 7.14, Russia 11.23, North America 14.19, Singapore 34.59 and United Arab Emirates 40.31.

See also

Nuclear energy in Portugal
Renewable energy in Portugal

References

 
Energy by country in the European Union